James Stanley Berger (January 3, 1903 – April 1, 1984) served as a Pennsylvania State Senator for the Republican Party from 1945 until 1968. Born in Warren County, Pennsylvania, he was a lawyer and lived in Potter County, Pennsylvania.

References

1903 births
1984 deaths
Presidents pro tempore of the Pennsylvania Senate
Republican Party Pennsylvania state senators
20th-century American politicians